Albiolo is a comune (municipality) in the Province of Como in the Italian region Lombardy, located about  northwest of Milan and about  west of Como.

Albiolo borders the following municipalities: Cagno, Faloppio, Olgiate Comasco, Solbiate, Uggiate-Trevano, Valmorea.

References

Cities and towns in Lombardy
Articles which contain graphical timelines